Pepper Adams Quintet (reissued as Pepper Adams 5), is the debut album by baritone saxophonist Pepper Adams recorded in 1957 and originally released on the Mode label.

Reception 

The Allmusic review by Ron Wynn states "Pepper Adams ranked among modern jazz's finest baritone saxophonists. His mastery of the middle and lower registers and technical acumen enabled him to play the physically cumbersome baritone with a speed, facility, and style usually restricted to smaller horns. This '57 quintet date featured him in a more relaxed context with West Coast jazz types". The Penguin Guide to Jazz described the album as "unusually relaxed".

Track listing 
 "Unforgettable" (Irving Gordon) – 6:22
 "Baubles, Bangles and Beads" (George Forrest, Robert Wright) – 8:29
 "Freddie Froo" (Pepper Adams) – 6:02
 "My One and Only Love" (Guy Wood, Robert Mellin) – 3:52
 "Muezzin" (Adams) – 5:52

Personnel 
Pepper Adams – baritone saxophone
Stu Williamson – trumpet, except track 4
Carl Perkins – piano
Leroy Vinnegar – bass
Mel Lewis – drums

References 

Pepper Adams albums
1957 albums